This is a list of the heads of government of the modern Greek state, from its establishment during the Greek Revolution to the present day. Although various official and semi-official appellations were used during the early decades of independent statehood, the title of prime minister has been the formal designation of the office at least since 1843. On dates, Greece officially adopted the Gregorian calendar on 16 February 1923 (which became 1 March). All dates prior to that, unless specifically denoted, are Old Style.

Color key

First Hellenic Republic (1822–1833) 
The heads of government of the provisional Greek state during the Greek War of Independence, and the subsequent Hellenic State.

Kingdom of Greece – Wittelsbach dynasty (1833–1862) 
The heads of government during the period of the Wittelsbach dynasty.

Kingdom of Greece – Glücksburg dynasty (1863–1924) 
The heads of government during the first period of the Glücksburg dynasty.

Second Hellenic Republic (1924–1935)

Kingdom of Greece – Glücksburg dynasty restored (1935–1974) 
The heads of government during the second period of the Glücksburg dynasty, including the rival governments during the Second World War and the Civil War, as well as the 1967–74 military regime.

Third Hellenic Republic (1974–present)

See also 
 List of heads of state of Greece
 Politics of Greece
 List of rulers of Greece
 Lists of office-holders

References

External links 

 Official website of the Prime Minister of Greece
 List of Greek heads of state and government

Greece, List of Prime Ministers of
Prime Ministers of Greece
Prime Ministers